The Committee on Foreign Affairs (AFET, after the French name ‘Affaires étrangères’), previously called Political Affairs, is a committee of the European Parliament. It is responsible for the common foreign, security, and defence policy of the European Union, as well as relations with other European and international institutions, strengthening relations with third countries, the accession of new member states, and human rights. During the Ninth European Parliament (2019–2024), the committee has 79 members and is chaired by David McAllister from Germany.

The committee has two subcommittees: the Subcommittee on Human Rights (DROI) and the Subcommittee on Security and Defence (SEDE).

Members
As of 12 April 2022, the 79 members of the committee are:

Chairpersons

Relations with Central Asia
The Committee on Foreign Affairs has established strong cooperation with Kazakhstan, Central Asia's most prosperous country, through regular visits and meetings. The European Parliament and Kazakhstan hold annual meetings of Parliamentary Cooperation Committee.

References

External links
 Official webpage